Ypsolopha satellitella is a moth of the family Ypsolophidae. It is known from Turkmenistan, Kyrghyzstan, north-western China, Afghanistan, the European part of Russia and Türkiye.

The wingspan is 23–25 mm.

References

External links
lepiforum.de

Ypsolophidae
Moths of Europe
Moths of Asia